Trujillo is the capital city of Trujillo State in Venezuela.	
About 40,000 people live in this city, located in El Valle de Los Mukas.

History
Founded by one of the "Conquistadores de America", Diego García de Paredes (1506 - 1563), son of Diego García de Paredes (the father), (1466-1534), Spanish soldier and duellist, native of Trujillo in Extremadura, Spain.

In 1678, Trujillo was the farthest point in a daring raid on Spanish-held Venezuela, carried out by six pirate ships and 700 men led by the French buccaneer Michel de Grammont.

Twin cities
 Trujillo, La Libertad (Peru)
 Trujillo (Honduras)
 Trujillo, Cáceres (Spain)

References

Cities in Trujillo (state)
Populated places established in 1557
1557 establishments in the Spanish Empire
Trujillo, Venezuela